The 2021 Qatar Open (also known as 2021 Qatar ExxonMobil Open for sponsorship reasons) was the 29th edition of the Qatar Open, a men's tennis tournament which is played on outdoor hard courts. It was part of the ATP Tour 250 of the 2021 ATP Tour. It took place at the Khalifa International Tennis and Squash Complex in Doha, Qatar from 8 to 14 March 2021. The tournament was awarded the Tournament of the Year award in the 250 category from the 2019 ATP Awards for the third time in five years.

Champions

Singles 

  Nikoloz Basilashvili def.  Roberto Bautista Agut, 7–6(7–5), 6–2

Doubles 

  Aslan Karatsev /  Andrey Rublev def.  Marcus Daniell  /  Philipp Oswald, 7–5, 6–4.

Points and prize money

Point distribution

Prize money 

*per team

Singles main-draw entrants

Seeds 

 1 Rankings are as of 1 March 2021.

Other entrants 
The following players received wildcards into the singles main draw:
  Malek Jaziri 
  Aslan Karatsev 
  Mubarak Shannan Zayid

The following players received entry from the qualifying draw:
  Lloyd Harris
  Christopher O'Connell
  Ramkumar Ramanathan
  Blaz Rola

The following player received entry as a lucky loser:
  Norbert Gombos

Withdrawals
Before the tournament
  Kevin Anderson → replaced by  Nikoloz Basilashvili
  Pablo Carreño Busta → replaced by  Richard Gasquet
  Borna Ćorić → replaced by  Norbert Gombos
  Hubert Hurkacz → replaced by  Alexander Bublik
  Gaël Monfils → replaced by  Vasek Pospisil
During the tournament
  Márton Fucsovics
  Richard Gasquet

Doubles main-draw entrants

Seeds 

 1 Rankings are as of 1 March 2021.

Other entrants 
The following pairs received wildcards into the doubles main draw:
  Malek Jaziri /  Mubarak Shannan Zayid
  Blaž Rola /  Mousa Shanan Zayed

Retirements 
  Frederik Nielsen /  Tim Pütz

References

External links 
 

 
2021 ATP Tour
2021
2021 in Qatari sport
March 2021 sports events in Asia